No-limit apnea is an AIDA International freediving discipline of competitive freediving, also known as competitive apnea, in which the freediver descends and ascends with the method of his or her choice. Often, a heavy metal bar or "sled" grasped by the diver descends fixed to a line, reaching great depths.  The most common ascension assistance is via inflatable lifting bags or vests with inflatable compartments, which surface rapidly.  The dives may be performed head-first or feet-first.

This form of diving is considered extremely dangerous by diving professionals. No-limit apnea has claimed the lives of several divers.

Challenges
The three main differences between free diving disciplines that involve diving to depth and those that occur at the surface are that you can not interrupt the dive, there are periods where work is performed and the diver is impacted by direct effects of pressure.

Records

See also

References

External links
Types of Diving
AIDA International: International Association for Development of Freediving
Current Freediving World Records